Fatjon is an Albanian masculine given name and may refer to:
Fatjon Andoni (born 1991), Greek-Albanian footballer
Fatjon Celani (born 1992), Albanian-German footballer
Fatjon Muhameti (born 1982), Albanian footballer 
Fatjon Sefa (born 1984), Albanian footballer
Fatjon Topi (born 1982), Albanian footballer

Albanian masculine given names